Lepismium is a genus of mostly epiphytic cacti, with seven species. They are found in tropical South America.

Species
Species accepted by the Plants of the World Online as of February 2021:

Lepismium cruciforme 
Lepismium floribundum 
Lepismium houlletianum 
Lepismium lineare 
Lepismium lorentzianum 
Lepismium lumbricoides 
Lepismium warmingianum

References

 
Cactoideae genera
Cacti of South America
Epiphytes